The whole blood clotting test is a blood test used to check the coagulation mechanism in the blood following a snake bite. If the test is positive after a bite in South East Asia it indicates the snake was a viper rather than an elapid.
It can also be used to assess the effectiveness of antivenin therapy.

Method 
This test indirectly measures the severity of defibrinogenation in envenomed samples. The test is done by collecting 2 ml  of venous blood in a dry and clean glass tube. The clot and stability of the formed clot is checked after 20 minutes .

References 

Blood tests